Gigafactory Shanghai (also known as Giga Shanghai, or Gigafactory 3) is the first oversea factory, located in Shanghai, China and operated by Tesla, Inc. The facility currently hosts the final assembly of the Tesla Model 3 and Tesla Model Y, with Model Y deliveries slated to begin in January 2021. The factory's initial production rate target is 3,000 cars a week, eventually ramping up to 250,000 electric cars per year. However it tripled the original capacity less than 3 years. The first assembled Model 3s were delivered in December 2019, just twelve months after Tesla began site grading on the Gigafactory in December 2018.

Construction began in December 2018 with the installation of secure fencing and site offices. The General Assembly Building was nearly complete by August 2019, and manufacturing line equipment was being installed for both batteries and automobiles. The plant began initial production of Tesla Model 3 cars in October 2019, with additional production facilities for motors, seats, and powertrain assemblies under construction in late 2019 with expected completion by March 2020.

Tesla is also building engineering and design teams in China.

Expansion of Giga Shanghai was halted in 2023 after the Chinese central government expressed concerns with Elon's activities at SpaceX, in particular the quickly expanding military applications of Starlink and its potential impact on global strategic defense.

Description 

The factory site is within Pudong District, with the western edge bordering Fengxian District.

History

Background and land purchase (2018) 
The Tesla (Shanghai) company was formally established 8 May 2018, with an authorized capital of 100 million yuan, wholly owned by Tesla Motors Hong Kong.
In July 2018 Tesla CEO Elon Musk signed an agreement with the Shanghai regional government to build its third Gigafactory, and the first in China.

On 8 August 2018, compulsory purchase order Shanghai [2018]  was issued by Pudong New Area Planning and Land Administration, with a closing date for objections of 14 August 2018, and finalization scheduled to occur on 20 August 2018.
On 26 September 2018, the bidding process for the newly acquired plots Q01-05 in the area designated as 04PD-0303 were advertised, with the restriction that the land be used for electric car manufacturing, with a minimum investment requirement. The investment requirement of 10.85 million yuan per mǔ (per ) equated to a total minimum investment of 14 billion yuan .

The bidding process ran between 17‒26 October 2018, with the proviso that if there was only one bidder meeting the requirements by 11:30 on 17 October 2018, then the process could be closed and finalized early.
Tesla (Shanghai) was the only bidder, with its bid of 973 million Chinese yuan for the 50-year lease covering the  site, with the capital coming from local Chinese banks. The Shanghai Land Transfer contract  with Tesla (Shanghai) required construction work to begin within 6 months, and be completed within 30 months, with production started after 36 months, and full minimum tax revenues being paid after 60 months.
Phase 1 of the project will manufacture Tesla Model 3 and Tesla Model Y cars, with a target production rate of 250,000 electric cars per year.
Tesla stated that it planned to eventually be able to produce 500,000 electric vehicles per year at the site.

The public environmental impact consultation for Phase 1 of the project was opened on 24 October 2018 and scheduled to run for ten working days.
The purchase was aided by a loan from Chinese banks, and converted to a $1.4 billion loan in late 2019, also by Chinese banks.

Construction and delivery (2019) 

A construction permit was granted by the Shanghai municipal government authorizing work to begin after 29 December 2018. The project contractor is China Construction Third Engineering Bureau Co., Ltd., part of China State Construction Engineering, a large state-owned construction company.

By December 2018, construction activity at the site was underway with site grading. Shanghai Mayor Ying Yong visited the site on 5 December. A subsidiary of China Minmetals was making preparations for piling foundations. Shanghai Construction Group was one of the companies bidding for part of the larger construction contract.

On 7 January 2019 the groundbreaking ceremony was held. By March, foundation work in some areas of the large facility was in place and structure is being erected, with crews operating at the site on multiple shifts to accelerate construction.

By early August 2019, the building exteriors were nearly complete, and the general assembly building was being fitted with manufacturing equipment, with a target to begin production in November.  The plant received its "comprehensive acceptance certificate" on 19 August.

In the 3Q2019 quarterly investor call on 23 October 2019, Tesla reported that it is ahead of schedule with getting the factory into production. Moreover, it was built in just ten months, is ready for production, and was built for approximately 65% less capital expenditure per unit of manufacturing capacity than had been the Model 3 production system in the US. General assembly of the initial Tesla Model 3s was operating by October 2019, with 30% of the car coming from China.

Expansion (2021) 
In April 2021, Local reports have noted that preliminary work on the new site south of the main complex has been going on for some time. Tesla was the sole bidder for the land, and while the bidding process Gigafactory produced vehicles and the Model Y at a rate of about 450,000 cars per year, the expanded site is already being prepared for construction.

Production (2019-today) 

Giga Shanghai currently does final assembly of Model 3 vehicles which began in December 2019, with expectation to begin Model Y final assembly later in 2020.  While initially, assembly is accomplished with parts and subassemblies that are shipped into the factory from the US, a major push during 2020 will be to gradually increase the "Made in China" (MIC) content in the car as Tesla China manufacturing matures.  , MIC Model Y production is slated for January 2021. Production line capacity of Giga Shanghai is aimed at 5,000 cars per week, and if achieved and sustained could result in an annual capacity of more than 250,000 vehicles. Once the factory has been fully built out and production has fully ramped, Tesla plans for the factory to reach an annual production capacity of about 500,000 vehicles for Chinese consumers.

Transport truck trailer rigs moved cars out by early December 2019, and the first 15 cars from the new factory were delivered on 30 December 2019, to Tesla employees.
The first cars to be produced at the Gigafactory and delivered to Chinese customers were delivered on 7 January 2020. Production rate was approximately 1,000 cars per week in early 2020, made by a single shift of workers with a total production line capacity of 2,000 cars per week when Saturday overtime is included.

The Gigafactory Shanghai was temporarily shut down for approximately two weeks by order of the government on 29 January 2020 due to the COVID-19 pandemic. Production resumed 10 February, as did for suppliers and other companies around the country. Several precautions were taken to prevent virus spread, so preliminary plans indicate Tesla could add a second shift of production by the beginning of Q2 2020 which would increase line capacity to approximately 3,500 vehicles per week. By the end of the year, it reached 8,000 vehicles per week, and some of them were found to be right hand drive for export purpose to Australia and New Zealand. In November 2021, total production was 56,965 vehicles and capacity was estimated to be nearing 700,000 vehicles per year, becoming the largest of the Tesla factories. On 28 March 2022, Gigafactory Shanghai was again shut down, this time for 22 days due to a government lockdown in response to the 2022 Shanghai COVID-19 outbreak. It officially reopened on 19 April 2022, initially operating only one shift, with 8,000 workers sleeping at the factory, but resumed normal production near the end of May.

On 12 January 2022, the China Association of Automobile Manufacturers (CAAM) announced that 310,000 new energy vehicles (NEVs) were exported from China in 2021, and that half of the total were assembled in Giga Shanghai. These produced cars are mainly sold to regions such as Europe and Asia and 10 more countries around the world. The main export destination for Chinese-made NEVs was Europe. The China Association of Automobile Manufactures (CAAMA) Data showed that the most popular option is Tesla's Model 3.

See also 
 List of Tesla factories

References

External links 
 Tesla GigaFactory 3 Shanghai Updates
 
 

Shanghai
Proposed buildings and structures in Shanghai
Motor vehicle assembly plants in China
2019 establishments in China
Shanghai, Giga